The Uzbekistan national rugby union sevens team is Uzbekistan's national rugby union sevens team.

Results

2010

References 

Uzbekistani rugby union teams
National rugby sevens teams
Rugby